The Basin Radio Network is a six-station small market broadcasting company located in northeast Wyoming, and is one of three divisions of Legend Communications of Wyoming, LLC. It is based in Gillette, Wyoming. The other divisions are the Big Horn Mountain Radio Network in Buffalo, Wyoming and the Big Horn Radio Network in Cody, Wyoming..

All three divisions are licensee divisions of Legend Communications of Wyoming, LLC, which owns and operates 15 radio broadcasting stations across Wyoming. The company is based at 1949 Mountain View Drive, Cody, Wyoming 82414 and 6805 Douglas Legum Drive, Suite 100, Elkridge, Maryland 20175. The corporate president is Dr. W. Lawrence Patrick, a radio industry professional for over 35 years, who holds Ph.D. in communications and management, as well as a law degree. The co-owner is Susan K. Patrick, M.B.A.

All the studios are at 2810 Southern Drive in Gillette.

 KIML (1270 AM/107,5 FM) "NewsRadio KIML"
 KLED (93.3 FM) "The Legend"
 KAML-FM (97.3 FM) "Today's Hit Music"
 KGWY (100.7 FM) "Fox Country 100.7"
 KDDV-FM (101.5 FM) "101-5 The Drive"
GRACE-FM (106.7 FM) "Today's Contemporary Christian Music"

External links
 Basin Radio Network
 Big Horn Mountain Radio Network

Radio broadcasting companies of the United States
Companies based in Wyoming
Gillette, Wyoming